Ram Avadh was an Indian politician. He was elected to the Lok Sabha, the lower house of the Parliament of India, as a member of the Janata Dal.

References

External links
Official biographical sketch in Lok Sabha website

India MPs 1980–1984
India MPs 1989–1991
India MPs 1991–1996
Lok Sabha members from Uttar Pradesh
1927 births
Janata Dal politicians